Victims of the Past (original German title:  Opfer der Vergangenheit: Die Sünde wider Blut und Rasse ("Victims of the Past: The Sin against Blood and Race")) is a Nazi propaganda film  made in 1937. This movie was a sequel to Erbkrank (Hereditarily Ill), which showed horrific images of lunatics in German asylums in order to bolster public support for the planned T-4 Euthanasia Program for the mentally ill. The practices of providing institutions and care for the victims of hereditary diseases are described as transgressing the law of natural selection, and the expense of such care is depicted as drain on healthy workers, and preventing the use of such money to help healthy Germans make better lives.

It was shown in every cinema in Germany. Adolf Hitler reportedly liked it.

Like the other five movies depicting the condition of the mentally ill in Germany, the movie was produced by the NS-Rasse und Politisches Amt (National Socialist Racial and Political Office). However, this film was the only one produced with sound.

See also
 Aktion T4
 List of films made in the Third Reich
 Nazism and cinema
 Euthanasia

References

External links

1937 documentary films
1937 films
Black-and-white documentary films
German documentary films
Nazi propaganda films
Films of Nazi Germany
Films about euthanasia
German black-and-white films
1930s German films